Marshall Lancaster (born 5 October 1974) is an English former actor. He has appeared in television dramas including Coronation Street, Holby City, The Lakes and Family Affairs. He is best known for playing DC Chris Skelton in the BBC time-travel police dramas, Life on Mars and Ashes to Ashes, the former set in 1973, and the latter set between 1981 and 1983. 
 
Lancaster is a former member of the Macclesfield-based theatre groups SCAMPS Youth Company, Paragon Youth Theatre and Macclesfield Amateur Dramatic Society. 
Until 23 August 2008 he starred in the York Theatre Royal's production of Mike Kenny's adaptation of The Railway Children alongside Colin Tarrant and Sarah Quintrell at the National Railway Museum.
Lancaster has one green and one blue eye, a condition known as heterochromia.
In January 2013 he started his own construction company, Marshall Lancaster Plastering, and works as a contractor in Macclesfield and surrounding areas.

Credits

Television

Radio

Film

Theatre

References

External links
 
 Official website
 Ashes to Ashes Press Release

1974 births
Living people
English male television actors
People from Macclesfield
Male actors from Cheshire